Fossil Ridge High School (FRHS) is an American public high school located in northeast Fort Worth, Texas. It is the second high school inside the Keller Independent School District. Most nearby schools such as Fossil Hill Middle School and Vista Ridge Middle School graduates feed into Fossil Ridge.

According to U.S. News & World Report, Fossil Ridge High School is ranked at #1,473 as one of the highest ranked high schools in the United States. In Texas, it is ranked at #142 as one of the highest ranked schools and was certified Silver.

Athletics

Football

Fossil Ridge currently has two freshman teams, one junior varsity team, and a varsity team. The teams play at the Keller Sports Complex.

In 2005, Fossil Ridge went back to the playoffs for the first time since the 2002 season.  Beginning with the 2014–2015 school year, Fossil Ridge has been reclassified to 6A.

Other sports offered at Fossil Ridge include basketball, baseball, softball, track and field, wrestling, power lifting, volleyball, tennis, golf, basketball, soccer, swimming and diving, bowling, rodeo, cross country, and ice hockey (district-wide team).

Extracurricular activities
The school's extracurricular choices include: Math Club, Uil Academic Teams, Chess Club, Academic Decathlon, Health Occupations Students of America, Business Professionals of America, College Bound, Fellowship of Christian Athletes, Forensics and Debate, Media Technology (formerly Broadcast Journalism)  ("Ridge TV", formerly "Fossil Ridge Live"), Yearbook ("Impressions"), Spirit Team ("Stray Cats"), Gymnastics Team, Drill Team ("Sun Dancers"), Keller ISD JROTC, Art, Photography, Ready, Set, Teach (a course directed towards recruiting future educators), Literary Journalism ("The R", formerly "The Panther Times"), Choir, Panther Jazz Ensemble, Theatre ("Theatre at the Ridge"), Cheerleading, Student Council, Band & Colorguard ("Panther Regiment"), and an array of subject-specific clubs (e.g. Spanish Club), National Honor Society, Rembrandt Society, National Art Honor Society, Anime Club, Uno Club

Theatre
 2006 - UIL One Act Play 'The Angelina Project' is awarded Second Runner Up at the State Meet.
 2007 - UIL One Act Play 'Gint' advances to the Regional Meet and is awarded Alternate.
 2008 - UIL One Act Play 'Eurydice' is awarded Best Actress and First Runner Up at the State Meet.
 2010 - UIL One Act Play 'The Shadow Box' participated in the state meet. Received multiple acting awards.

JROTC
Fossil Ridge currently has an AFJROTC program. However, the program takes place at Central High School, a neighboring school in the KISD. The program consists of participants from all 4 KISD high schools.

Marching band and color guard

The Fossil Ridge Panther Regiment is a marching band and color guard.

The 2006 Senior Class received over $4.4 million in scholarship offers.

The Panther Regiment has made back-to-back appearances in the 2007 4A and 2008 5A State Marching Band Contests.

Notable alumni
Ali Alexander
Chris Boswell
Sheldon Neuse
Debby Ryan

References

External links
 Official School Website
 Fossil Ridge Panther Regiment
 Keller ISD JROTC official website
 DFWVarsity.com

Educational institutions established in 1995
Public high schools in Fort Worth, Texas
Keller Independent School District high schools
School buildings completed in 1998
Public high schools in Texas
1995 establishments in Texas